Dermot James Meagher (born October 19, 1940) is an American lawyer and former judge of the Boston Municipal Court.  Meagher was the first openly gay judge appointed in Massachusetts.

Early life and education
Meagher received an A.B. from Harvard University and an LL.B. from Boston College Law School.

Legal career
He began his legal career as an Assistant District Attorney in Worcester County, Massachusetts.
He was in private practice various times. He was First Assistant Bar Counsel at the Massachusetts Board of Bar Overseers and was later a volunteer member of the Boston Human Rights Commission. He was a Fellow at the Harvard Law School Center for Criminal Justice which is funded by the Ford Foundation.

Other activities
He is a former member of the board of directors of the Gay and Lesbian Advocates and Defenders (GLAD). He is a founder and member of the Massachusetts Lesbian and Gay Bar Association (MLGBA) and was a member the AIDS Action Committee Legal Services Committee. He was also one of the founders of Lawyers Concerned for Lawyers (LCL) of Massachusetts.

Judicial service
Meagher first applied to be considered for a judicial appointment in Massachusetts in 1985.  In 1989, Governor Michael Dukakis selected Meagher to serve on the Boston Municipal Court.  Meagher was sworn in on May 3, 1989. He retired in 2006.

Personal
Meagher is a recovering alcoholic who achieved sobriety in 1975; he came out of the closet shortly thereafter.

See also 
 List of LGBT jurists in the United States

References

1940 births
Living people
20th-century American judges
20th-century American lawyers
21st-century American judges
21st-century American lawyers
21st-century LGBT people
American gay men
Boston College Law School alumni
Harvard University alumni
LGBT appointed officials in the United States
LGBT judges
LGBT people from Massachusetts
Massachusetts state court judges
People from Worcester, Massachusetts